Gay's the Word is an independent bookshop in central London, and the oldest LGBT bookshop in the United Kingdom. Inspired by the emergence and growth of lesbian and gay bookstores in the United States, a small group of people from Gay Icebreakers, a gay socialist group, founded the store in 1979. These included Peter Dorey, Ernest Hole and Jonathan Cutbill.  Various locations were looked at, including Covent Garden, which was then being regenerated, before they decided to open the store in Marchmont Street in Bloomsbury, an area of the capital with rich academic and literary associations. Initial reluctance from Camden Council to grant a lease was overcome with help from Ken Livingstone, then a local councillor, later Mayor of London. For a period of time, it was the only LGBT bookshop in England.

History
From the beginning, the bookshop was used as a community and information resource for lesbians and gay men providing information on gay organisations and forthcoming events. The shop hosted musical evenings and on the piano sat the score for the musical which inspired its name—Gay's the Word by Ivor Novello. Various organisations and community groups used the shop after hours for meetings, including Icebreakers, the Lesbian Discussion Group (still going after 30 years), Gay Black Group and the Gay Disabled Group. It's also the venue for meetings of TransLondon. The cafe and piano are no longer there but the noticeboard is still in use and free gay papers are distributed from there.

When the shop was founded in 1979, gay books were not generally available in ordinary bookstores. The early newsletters listed the few radical bookstores in the country where gay books were available and Gay News had an excellent and pioneering mail order service. The gay movement at this period in the United States was particularly vibrant and stimulated an immense amount of literature with many small publishing houses being established. Gay's the Word had to import a large part of its stock from the US as not enough gay books were published in the UK. Lesbian and gay publishing houses which were later established in the UK include Gay Men's Press, Brilliance Books, Onlywomen Press and Third House.

In 1984, Customs and Excise, assuming the shop to be a porn store rather than a serious bookstore, mounted a large-scale raid and seized thousands of pounds' worth of stock. Works by Tennessee Williams, Gore Vidal, Christopher Isherwood and Jean Genet as well as the Joy of Gay Sex and Joy of Lesbian Sex were among the books seized. Directors were eventually charged with conspiracy to import indecent books under the Customs Consolidation Act 1876. Unlike the situation with the Obscene Publications Act, which governs literature published in the UK, the Customs Consolidation Act 1876 does not provide for a literary or artistic defence of titles. A campaign was set in motion and the charges were vigorously defended. A defence fund was set up and raised over £55,000 from the public. Many well-known writers also gave their support and Gore Vidal donated £3,000. Newspaper articles appeared, various MPs visited the shop and questions were asked in the House of Commons. The charges were eventually dropped in 1986.

The shop has hosted many readings and signings by well-known and emerging writers. Edmund White, David Leavitt, Stella Duffy, Armistead Maupin, Jake Arnott, Damian Barr, Alan Hollinghurst, Philip Hensher, Charlotte Mendelson, Patrick Gale, Neil Bartlett, Alison Bechdel, Jake Shears, Emily Danforth, Ali Smith, Jackie Kay, Alex Bertie and Thomas Page McBee have read or done signings at the bookshop. It is a popular venue for poetry readings and has attracted poets such as Andrew McMillan, Richard Scott, Kate Foley, Sophia Blackwell, Keith Jarrett, Mary Jean Chan, Gregory Woods and John McCullough. It has also hosted talks by biographers Neil McKenna (The Secret Life of Oscar Wilde), Sheila Rowbotham (Edward Carpenter); historians Matt Cook (A Gay History of Britain) and Matt Houlbrook (Queer London): Dennis Altman, Jeffrey Weeks and many other leading lesbian and gay academics and activists. A documentary on the bookstore by Douglas Belford was shown in 2006 at the London Lesbian and Gay Film Festival and can be viewed on YouTube.

Lesbians and Gays Support the Miners used to meet at the bookshop and collect money for the striking miners in 1984/85. When the meetings grew too large for the space they moved their meetings to the Fallen Angel pub. The 2014 film Pride, directed by Matthew Warchus, featured the group as they campaigned and raised money for striking Welsh miners and depicts the shop being a target for several instances of homophobic aggression and vandalism. Filming actually took place in a building on Kingsgate Road, West Hampstead. In 2017 a blue plaque was unveiled above the bookshop in honour of Mark Ashton, gay rights activist and co-founder of LGSM.

In 2018, Gay's the Word loaned part of their archive to Senate House Library for the Queer Between the Covers Exhibition. They gave a talk on the infamous Customs raid of 1984 and subsequently were invited to repeat the talk at the Houses of Parliament. The 40th anniversary of Gay's the Word was marked by a special event at the British Library.

Gay's the Word has been subjected to a number of homophobic attacks. These have led to its windows being broken. The store was broken into on 9 February 2020. The two burglars ransacked the bookshop, stole change from a charity collection tin and were arrested within the store while drinking a bottle of prosecco. Gay's the Word re-opened the next day.

Campaigns
In 2007, with rising rents and the effect of Internet book-buying, the bookshop faced possible closure. It launched a campaign to stay open which got huge press coverage in newspapers like The Guardian, The Times and The Independent as well as the gay press like QX and Boyz. The shop workers were taken aback by the public response to the appeal with news on the crisis featuring in blogs from Russia to Australia, to America and Europe. Its future, for the present, is secure. Sarah Waters recently said of the shop "Gay's the Word is still Britain's best outlet for lesbian, gay and trans-interest books. The stock is wonderfully wide-ranging, the staff are friendly and knowledgeable and the atmosphere's great. I've been shopping there for years and I'm delighted that it's still going strong".

See also

Silver Moon Bookshop, a women's bookshop in London
LGBT culture in London
 List of LGBT bookstores

External links 
 website of 'Gay's The Word'

Footnotes

References
 
 
 
 
 

Bookshops in London
LGBT bookstores
LGBT culture in London
LGBT organisations in London
Bookstores established in the 20th century
Retail companies established in 1979
1979 establishments in England
Independent bookshops of the United Kingdom